Mthatha General Hospital is a large Provincial government funded hospital situated in central Mthatha in South Africa. It is a general hospital and forms part of the Mthatha Hospital Complex.

The hospital departments include Emergency department, Paediatric ward, Maternity ward, Obstetrics/Gynecology, Out Patients Department, Surgical Services, Medical Services, Operating Theatre & CSSD Services, Pharmacy, Anti-Retroviral (ARV) treatment for HIV/AIDS, Post Trauma Counseling Services, Occupational Services, X-ray Services, Physiotherapy, NHLS Laboratory, Oral Health Care Provides, Laundry Services, Kitchen Services and Mortuary.

References

Hospitals in the Eastern Cape
King Sabata Dalindyebo Local Municipality